The Autonomous Centre of Edinburgh, also known as ACE, is an infoshop and autonomous social centre in Edinburgh, Scotland. It was founded in 1997, although it follows on from previous groups.

Antecedents
ACE formed out of the Edinburgh Unemployed Workers Centre of the 1980s, which was originally a non-partisan council office, which later split from the council when it became increasingly politicised due to the struggles of the period such as resistance to the poll tax. Glaswegian writer James Kelman gave a speech at the opening of the Edinburgh Unemployed Workers Centre which is featured in Kelman's book And the Judges said. Kelman has publicly expressed support for ACE.

Setting Up
In a flyer circulated in 1996, ACE stated the following aims for the project:

 Advice and solidarity against dole harassment
 A meeting place for community-political groups
 Radical books, 'zines, and information
 A low-cost vegan cafe and drop-in centre
 Local arts and crafts
 Underground records, demos, t-shirts, badges
 People's food co-operative
 Socializing in an anti-sexist, -racist, or -homophobic environment
 An epicenter of alternative/DIY kulture (Spelling and emphasis in original.)

2000s
In 2000 the following groups were using the centre: Autonomous Women of Edinburgh, Angry Youth, Edinburgh Animal Rights, Youth Solidarity Group, the Mutiny Collective and Prisoners’ Support, May Day Edinburgh, anti-terrorism bill. In 2005, the groups were as follows: Stop the War (Edinburgh), Campaign for Nuclear Disarmament (Scotland), Independent Media Centre Scotland, No War but the Class War, Peace Camp, the A701 Protest Camp (the Bilston Glen antibypass campaign).

The revolutionary, class struggle anarchist news sheet Counter Information was based in the centre.

Recent Events
In 2014 those involved with the ACE collective produced the statement "From Yes to Action", an attempt to understand the political context after the failed Scottish independence referendum.

In 2016 ACE supported University of Edinburgh students who occupied Charles Stewart House demanding divestment.

ACE is a founding member of Action Against Austerity.

See also
 The 1 in 12 Club
 Cowley Club
 London Action Resource Centre
 Sumac Centre
 Warzone Collective

References

Further reading
History of ACE

Organisations based in Edinburgh
Social centres in the United Kingdom
Infoshops